Cherry River may refer to:

 Cherry River (Quebec)
 Cherry River (West Virginia)